Descendants (Original TV Movie Soundtrack) is a soundtrack album by cast of the film of the same name, released on July 31, 2015 by Walt Disney Records. The soundtrack peaked at number 1 in United States at Billboard 200, number one on the US Top Digital Albums and topped the US Top Soundtracks.

Album history 
Initially, the film was not envisioned as a musical. It was not until director/choreographer Kenny Ortega came on board that songs were added. The film itself contains seven musical numbers, plus a song by Shawn Mendes during the end credits, which was released as a single. In addition, the soundtrack album includes four bonus tracks as well as a suite of the David Lawrence's orchestral score. Not included on the soundtrack is the Vancouver Children's Choir Choral Society's interpretation of "Laudamus te" from Antonio Vivaldi's Gloria, which was heard at Prince Ben's coronation ceremony and the Overture of the orchestral suite Music for the Royal Fireworks composed by George Handel, which is heard at the entrance of the temple.

Commercial performance 
The soundtrack debuted at No. 1 on the Billboard 200 with 42,000 album-equivalent units earned during its first week of release. It is the smallest weekly total for a No. 1 album since the chart began ranking albums by equivalent units in December 2014. It also dethroned R&B singer Jill Scott's Woman from its debut at No. 1, with only 30,000 units sold after. It is the first Disney Channel Original Movie since High School Musical 2 to have a soundtrack hit No. 1 on the Billboard 200. "Good is the New Bad" appeared in the Descendants: Wicked World short of the same name.

Singles 
"If Only", performed by Dove Cameron, was released as single on July 31, 2015. The song was written by Adam Anders, Nikki Hassman and Peer Astrom. It debuted at number 99 in the Billboard Hot 100 and peaked at 94. The second version of "Rotten to the Core", (written by Shelly Peiken, Joacim Persson and Johann Alkenas,) and performed by Sofia Carson was released as second single on December 18. The decision to release the song was made to promote the computer-animated short-form series Descendants: Wicked World, for which Carson's version is the opening theme. The song did not enter the Billboard Hot 100, but peaked at number five on the Bubbling Under Hot 100 Singles chart.

Promotional singles 
"Believe", performed by Shawn Mendes, was released as promotional single on June 26, 2015. The song received a nomination for Choice Music: Song from a Movie at the 2015 Teen Choice Awards.

Other charted songs 
The original version of "Rotten to the Core", performed by Dove Cameron, Cameron Boyce, Booboo Stewart and Sofia Carson, debuted at number 38 on the US Billboard Hot 100. "Did I Mention", performed by Mitchell Hope and Jeff Lewis, peaked at number 2 on the Billboard Bubbling Under Hot 100 Singles chart. "Evil Like Me", performed by Kristin Chenoweth and Dove Cameron, debuted at number 14 and peaked at number 12 on the Billboard Bubbling Under Hot 100 Singles chart. "Set It Off", performed by Dove Cameron, Sofia Carson, Cameron Boyce, Booboo Stewart, Mitchell Hope, Sarah Jeffery and Jeff Lewis, debuted at number 17 and peaked at number 11 on the Billboard Bubbling Under Hot 100 Singles chart.

Accolades

Track listing

Charts

Weekly charts

Year-end charts

Certifications

References 

2015 soundtrack albums
Disney film soundtracks
Pop soundtracks
Walt Disney Records soundtracks
Descendants (franchise)